The apusomonads (order Apusomonadida) are a group of protozoan zooflagellates that glide on surfaces, and mostly consume prokaryotes.  They are of particular evolutionary interest because they appear to be the sister group to the Opisthokonts, the clade that includes both animals and fungi. Together with the Breviatea, these form the Obazoa clade.

Characteristics and morphology
Apusomonads are small gliding heterotrophic biflagellates (= with two flagella) that possess a proboscis, formed partly or entirely by the anterior flagellum surrounded by a membranous sleeve. There is a pellicle under the dorsal cell membrane that extends into the proboscis sleeve and into a skirt that covers the sides of the cell. Apusomonads present two different cell plans:
Derived cell plan, represented by Apusomonas, with a round cell body and a mastigophore, a projection of the cell containing both basal bodies at its end.
"Amastigomonas-like" cell plan, with an oval or oblong cell that generally forms pseudopodia from the ventral surface, with no mastigophore, and the proboscis comprising solely the flagellum and the sleeve. These characteristics are considered 'primitive' or 'ancestral' in comparison with Apusomonas. Organisms with this body plan, although historically assigned to the same genus Amastigomonas, are a paraphyletic group from which Apusomonas has evolved.

Evolutionary relationships

External relationships and importance
The apusomonads are the sister group to Opisthokonta, the lineage that includes animals, fungi and an array of related protists. Because of this, apusomonads occupy an important phylogenetic position to understand eukaryotic evolution. They retain ancestral characteristics, such as the biflagellate body plan, which in opisthokonts evolves into a uniflagellate plan.

Apusomonads are vital to understanding multicellularity. Genes involved in multicellularity have been found in the apusomonad Thecamonas, such as adhesion proteins, calcium-signaling genes and types of sodium channels characteristic of animals. The genome of the strain "Amastigomonas sp." presents the integrin-mediated adhesion machinery, the primary cell-matrix adhesion mechanism seen in Metazoa (animals).

Internal relationships
Apusomonads are a poorly and narrowly studied group. Currently, the diversity of described apusomonads consists of the round Apusomonas and a wide array of "Amastigomonas-type" organisms that have been reclassified into the genera Thecamonas, Manchomonas, Podomonas, Multimonas, Chelonemonas and, most recently, Catacumbia, Cavaliersmithia, Karpovia, Mylnikovia and Singekia. The relationships between these genera are depicted by the cladogram below.

Classification
The current classification of Apusomonadida does not utilize the rank of family to divide the different genera. However, the group itself is an order-level taxon, and is sometimes included in the monotypic class Thecomonadea. There are 10 recognized genera, as well as the "Amastigomonas-like" archetype that includes primitive forms not yet transferred to new genera.
"Amastigomonas" 
A. caudata  [Amastigomonas borokensis ]
A. debruynei 
A. marisrubri 
Apusomonas  [Rostromonas ]
A. australiensis 
A. proboscidea  [Rostromonas applanata ]
Catacumbia 
C. lutetiensis 
Cavaliersmithia 
C. chaoae 
Karpovia 
K. croatica 
Manchomonas 
Manchomonas bermudensis  [Amastigomonas bermudensis ]
Multimonas 
M. koreensis 
M. marina  [Cercomonas marina ; Amastigomonas marina ]
M. media 
Mylnikovia 
M. oxoniensis  [Thecamonas oxoniensis ]
Podomonas 
P. capensis 
P. gigantea  [Amastigomonas gigantea ]
P. griebenis  [Amastigomonas griebenis ]
P. kaiyoae 
P. klosteris  [Amastigomonas klosteris ]
P. magna 
Singekia 
S. franciliensis 
S. montserratensis 
Thecamonadinae  [Thecamonas/Chelomonas clade]
Chelonemonas 
C. dolani 
C. geobuk 
C. masanensis 
Thecamonas 
T. filosa  [Amastigomonas filosa ]
T. muscula  [Amastigomonas muscula ]
T. mutabilis  [Rhynchomonas mutabilis ; Amastigomonas mutabilis ]
T. trahens  [Amastigomonas trahens ]

References

External links